The Lao Loum is an official Lao People's Democratic Republic designation for lowland dwelling Tai peoples, including the majority Lao people. The Lao Loum, literally meaning 'lowland Lao', are the inhabitants of the river valleys and lowlands along the Mekong River and make up over 68% of the population of Laos, of whom half are of the Lao ethnic group. Other members categorised as Lao Loum are the other large Tai groups, such as the Phuan and Phu Thai and other closely related members of Tai ethnic groups.

Ethnic groups in Laos
Ethnic groups in Thailand